Sweet Taste of Liberty may refer to:

Sweet Taste of Liberty: A True Story of Slavery and Restitution in America, a book by W. Caleb McDaniel
"Sweet Taste of Liberty", an episode from  season 1 of How I Met Your Mother